Juan Victor Séjour Marcou et Ferrand (June 2, 1817 – September 20, 1874) was an American Creole of color and expatriate writer. Born in New Orleans, he spent most of his career in Paris. His fiction and plays were written and published in French. Although mostly unknown to later American writers of the nineteenth century, his short story "Le Mulâtre" ("The Mulatto") is the earliest known work of fiction by an African American author. In France, however, he was known chiefly for his plays.

Biography
Juan Victor Séjour was born on June 2, 1817, in New Orleans to François Marcou, a free man of color from Saint-Domingue (today's Haiti), and Eloisa Philippe Ferrand, a New Orleans-born quadroon. His parents were wealthy and had him educated in a private school. There were no public schools for people of color in New Orleans, and the society as a whole was segregated.

At the age of nineteen Séjour moved to Paris to continue his education and find work. Other free people of color from the US, whose families were wealthy enough, also studied in Paris. There he met members of the Parisian literary elite, including Cyrille Bissette, publisher of the black-owned journal La Revue des Colonies.

Bisette published "Le Mulâtre" (in French), Séjour's first work, in 1837. The story of a loyal slave exacting revenge on his cruel white master and father for the death of the slave's wife, "Le Mulâtre" contains an indictment of New World slavery that is found in none of Séjour's subsequent work.

Séjour turned away from writing fiction, composing an ode to Napoleon in 1841. He published the verse drama The Jew of Seville, which was premiered in 1844. The latter established his reputation as a playwright. He wrote Richard III, a Shakespeare-inspired costume drama about Richard III of England, which became Séjour's most acclaimed work. Toward the end of his life, however, Séjour's plays fell out of favor, resulting in a decline in his status.

Written in French, "Le Mulâtre" had little influence on American literature of the period. It was not translated into English until the late 20th century, when Séjour became the subject of new academic studies in the United States. Its condemnation of slavery, however, anticipates the work of such 19th-century African-American writers publishing in English as Frederick Douglass and William Wells Brown.

The Brown Overcoat (1858)
Unlike in his fiction, Séjour tended to leave discussions of race out of his plays. This is best exemplified by his play The Brown Overcoat, a typical artificial comedy of the time period with witty comments and puns, avoiding race and social commentary entirely. Despite this, Séjour is still recognized  as a great African-American playwright, who had a successful career in France.

Personal life 
Séjour was Catholic.

References

Bibliography
Victor Séjour; Philip Barnard (translator). "The Mulatto." In Nellie Y. McKay and Henry Louis Gates (editors). The Norton Anthology of African American Literature Second edition, Norton, 2004.  
Victor Séjour; Norman R. Shapiro (translator). The Jew of Seville. University of Illinois Press, 2002.  
Victor Séjour. "Le Mulâtre". Revue des Colonies Paris, 3:9 (March 1837), pages 376–392.
Brickhouse, Anna. Transamerican Literary Relations and the Nineteenth-Century Public Sphere. Cambridge: Cambridge University Press, 2004.
Hatch, James V., and Ted Shine. Black Theatre USA: Plays by African Americans. New York: Free, 1996. Print.

Further reading
 Charles Edwards O'Neill, Séjour: Parisian Playwright from Louisiana (University of Southwestern Louisiana, 1995), a book-length biography.

External links
  
 "Le Mulâtre" (French)
 Piacentino, Ed. "Seeds of Rebellion in Plantation Fiction: Victor Séjour's 'The Mulatto' ". Southern Spaces. 28 August 2007 
 The Victor Séjour Collection at  The Historic New Orleans Collection

1817 births
1874 deaths
Writers from New Orleans
American writers of Haitian descent
Louisiana Creole people
American expatriates in France
African-American dramatists and playwrights
African-American poets
American writers in French
19th-century American dramatists and playwrights
19th-century American poets
American male poets
American male dramatists and playwrights
American male short story writers
19th-century American short story writers
19th-century American male writers
African-American Catholics
African-American male writers